The Queensland Citizen Bushmen, also known as the 3rd Queensland Mounted Infantry, was a mounted infantry regiment raised in Queensland for service during the Second Boer War. Formed as part of the third Queensland contingent with an original strength of 316 men, it departed for South Africa on 2 March 1900 aboard the Duke of Portland.  Under the command of Major Walter Tunbridge, it initially served in Rhodesia, and later in west Transvaal, where it took part in the Relief of Mafeking, and actions at Koster River and Elands River. It then served in northern Transvaal, including actions at Rhenoster Kop and Wolwekuil, and the advance on Pietersburg. Fatal casualties included three men killed or died of wounds, and five dead from disease. The unit returned to Australia in June 1901 on the Morayshire.

Notes

References

Further reading

Military units and formations established in 1900
Military units and formations disestablished in 1901
Military units and formations of the Second Boer War
Organisations based in Queensland